David Todd Markle  is a Judge of the Georgia Court of Appeals.

Education

Markle graduated magna cum laude from the University of Georgia in 1986 and cum laude from Walter F. George School of Law in 1989.

Legal career

Markle began his legal career in Atlanta in 1989.  He started his own law firm in 1996 handling general civil litigation. In January 2011, he left private practice to become executive counsel to newly elected Governor Deal.

State court service

In July 2011 Governor Nathan Deal appointed him as a Judge on the Fulton Judicial Circuit of the Fifth District Superior Court.

Appointment to Georgia Court of Appeals

In 2017 Markle was under consideration to for a seat on the Court of Appeals. On December 7, 2018 Markle was appointed the Court of Appeals to succeed William McCrary Ray II who was confirmed to be a federal judge.

References

External links
Official Biography on Georgia Judicial Branch website

1964 births
Living people
Georgia (U.S. state) lawyers
Georgia (U.S. state) state court judges
Georgia Court of Appeals judges
University of Georgia alumni
University of Georgia School of Law alumni
20th-century American lawyers
21st-century American judges
21st-century American lawyers